Allogaster unicolor is a species of beetle that belongs to the longhorn beetle family. They are mainly found in parts of Africa, specifically Namibia, South Africa, Tanzania, and Zimbabwe.

References 

Achrysonini
Insects of Zimbabwe
Beetles of Africa